Qaddas is a sub-district located in Al Udayn District, Ibb Governorate, Yemen. Qaddas had a population of 6286 according to the 2004 census.

References 

Sub-districts in Al Udayn District